Monique de Bissy (married Schimmelpenninck; 13 March 1923 – 17 November 2009) was a French-Belgian resistance member during World War II.

She was born in Schaerbeek, Belgium and died in Montpellier, France.

Belgian Resistance
Monique de Bissy started the war as a nurse for the Belgian Red Cross and then she enrolled in the Resistance after the Belgian defeat in 1940 (aged 17). She worked for several resistance groups, such as the « Brigade Blanche », and the « Ailes Brisées ». She also worked on the Comet Line. She organized and participated in the escape to Spain of 20 Allies pilots after their aircraft had been shot by the German Army around the Belgian city of Liège. She was arrested in 1944 after denunciation and was taken to the jail of Maastricht in Netherlands where she was tortured.

After four months of detention she was liberated by U.S. troops in August 1944. She never gave any information to the Nazis during her captivity and she managed to keep her resistance partners safe by her silence.

Monique de Bissy enlisted as a nurse in the French army in September 1944.

Post-war Activities
After the war she continued to work as a nurse, first in Belgian Congo, then in Montpellier (south of France) after the independence of the Belgian colony.

In 1946 Monique de Bissy married Gerrit Schimmelpenninck with whom she had three children: Gérard (1947), Sonia (1956) and Joëlle (1958). She has had six grandchildren: Stéphanie (1980), Louis (1981), Sophie (1983), Astrid (1987), Xavier (1990) and Olivier (1991).

She died on 17 November 2009, six months after receiving the Légion d'Honneur from French Senator Jacqueline Gourault in the name of President Nicolas Sarkozy for her contribution to Peace and Freedom during World War II.

Medals 
Numerous countries have expressed their gratitude through number of medals:
 Belgium: "Médaille de la Résistance" (Resistance Medal) and "Médaille commémorative de la guerre 1940-1945" (Commemorative Medal of World War II) with Belgian Lion,
 United Kingdom: King's Medal for Courage in the Cause of Freedom,
 USA: Medal of Freedom,
 France: Légion d'Honneur.

Gallery

See also 
 Bissy (family)
 Schimmelpenninck (family)
 Belgian Resistance during World War II
 French resistance during World War II
 Red Cross

References

External links 
 Website of Belgian Resistant group "Comète" with the full list of Allies pilots saved and Belgian resistants

French Resistance members
de Bissy
Red Cross personnel
Recipients of the Resistance Medal
Recipients of the King's Medal for Courage in the Cause of Freedom
Recipients of the Medal of Freedom
Recipients of the Legion of Honour
1923 births
2009 deaths
People from Schaerbeek